The 2013 Morgan State Bears football team represented Morgan State University in the 2013 NCAA Division I FCS football season. They were led by 13th-year head coach Donald Hill-Eley and played their home games at Hughes Stadium. They were a member of the Mid-Eastern Athletic Conference (MEAC).

Morgan State entered the 2013 with a new coordinators on both sides of the ball. Greg Gregory joined the team as the new offensive coordinator. Gregory came to Morgan State after being out of football in 2012. He was the offensive coordinator at the University of South Alabama from 2009 to 2011 and has previously been a head coach at Missouri Southern State University from 1998 to 1999. Jerry Holmes joined as the defensive coordinator. Holmes previously served as head coach at Hampton University in 2008 and has coached as defensive coordinator for the Cleveland Browns (1999–2000), Washington Redskins (2001), San Diego Chargers (2002–2003), and Hampton (2004–2007).

The Bears entered the 2013 season having been picked to finish ninth in the 2013 season. Morgan State hoped to prove those predictions wrong with their 3-second All-MEAC Pre-season members.

They finished the season 5–7, 5–3 in MEAC play to finish in a tie for third place.  At the end of the season, Hill-Eley was fired.

Schedule

Source: Schedule

References

Morgan State
Morgan State Bears football seasons
Morgan State Bears football